Chris Tierney may refer to:

Chris Tierney (soccer) (born 1986), American soccer player
Chris Tierney (ice hockey) (born 1994), Canadian ice hockey player
Christopher Tierney, stunt performer hurt in a preview performance of Spider-Man: Turn Off the Dark